Kauffmania is a monotypic genus of fungi belonging to the family Psathyrellaceae. The only species is Kauffmania larga.

The species was described by Örstadius and E. Larss in 2015.

References

Psathyrellaceae
Agaricales genera